Rigunth (c. 569 C.E – after 589 C.E), also known as Rigundis, was a Frankish princess, daughter of the Merovingian King Chilperic I and Fredegund.

Biography 
Rigunth was the eldest child and only recorded daughter of Chilperic and Fredegund. About 583, she was betrothed to Recared, eldest son of Leovigild, King of the Visigoths. In September 584 she was sent to Spain in a convoy with a large treasure as dowry. During the journey King Chilperic died and the soldiers escorting the princess took everything they could steal and fled. At Toulouse, Duke Didier seized what was left. The princess was returned to her mother in 585.

She took refuge with her mother and led a life viewed as debauched. She often quarreled with her mother who failed in an attempt to kill her in 589. Her date of death is unknown.

Further reading
 Eugen Ewig: Die Merowinger und das Frankenreich. 4. Auflage, Kohlhammer Verlag, Stuttgart 2001. 
 Martina Hartmann: Aufbruch ins Mittelalter. Die Zeit der Merowinger. Darmstadt 2003, .

References

External links

 Gregory of Tours, Historiae

Merovingian dynasty
569 births
Year of death unknown
Frankish princesses
6th-century Frankish women
6th-century Frankish nobility
Daughters of kings